Robidoux is an unincorporated community in Washington County, in the U.S. state of Missouri.

The community takes its name from nearby Robidoux Branch.

References

Unincorporated communities in Washington County, Missouri
Unincorporated communities in Missouri